TOKİ (literally "Mass Housing Development Administration") is Turkey's government-backed housing agency.

Founded in 1984, TOKİ carries out projects and activities primarily throughout Turkey in line with the government building and mass housing priorities. In 2004 the Government enabled the Districts with a new municipality law to cooperate with TOKİ to develop unprivileged areas.

Domestic Projects 
Projects include:
 Regeneration and transformation of informal areas and settlements (gecekondu)
 Social housing projects toward the middle- and low-income categories
 Establishing model settlement units in our medium-scale provinces and districts
 Developing historic fabric and local architecture
 Educational and social facilities 
 Reconstruction activities and disaster relief

TOKİ aims to complete 1 million housing units by the end of 2023 and plans to complete 64,000 units in 2017, worth $2.5 billion.

As of June 2017, TOKİ has delivered;

 Over 590,000 housing units, 86% of which are classified as social housing which targets lower income groups.
 563 schools
 Over 10,000 social facilities including sport halls, cultural centers, libraries, mosques, commercial centers and hospitals.

International Projects 
TOKİ carries out mainly disaster relief and reconstruction activities worldwide, in cooperation with other international aid agencies.

Projects completed include;
 1050 houses in Aceh, Indonesia
 500 houses in Sri Lanka
 4620 houses and 37 social facilities in Pakistan
 200-bed hospital and 40-class nurse college in Somalia

Awards 
 HABITAT Scroll of HONOR in 1994 for the Erzincan Earthquake  Reconstruction Project.
 International Award for Entrepreneurship in Real Estate and  Housing Development in 2008, Expo Italia Real Estate
 HABITAT Best Practice Award in 2008 for the Erzincan Çarşı Quarter Urban Renewal-Slum Transformation Project

References

External links 
 Official website of TOKİ

Turkish governmental institutions